The Queen's Personal Jamaican Flag was the personal flag of Queen Elizabeth II for use in Jamaica. The Queen's Representative, the Governor-General of Jamaica had his own flag.

The flag consists of a banner of the coat of arms of Jamaica superposed by the Queen's Royal Cypher. The flag is white and bears a red St George's Cross. A gold pineapple is on each arm of the Cross. A blue disc with the Royal Cypher is placed in the centre of the Cross. The disc is taken from the Queen's Personal Flag.

See also
 Flag of Jamaica
 Royal Standard of the United Kingdom
 List of Jamaican flags

References

External links
 Queen Elizabeth II's Personal Standard in Jamaica at Flags of the World. Accessed 16 January 2007.

Flags introduced in 1962
Flags of Jamaica
Jamaica